The D4 was a rock band from Auckland, New Zealand. Their music was released by Hollywood Records in the U.S., Flying Nun Records in New Zealand and by Infectious Records in the UK.

The group was assembled by vocalist/guitarists Dion Palmer and Jimmy Christmas, who put together a collection of songs and built a four-piece combo, featuring founding members English Jake and Rich Mixture, during late 1998 and started playing at the Frisbee Leisure Lounge parties along Symonds Street, followed shortly thereafter by inner city pub gigs. They have also played at the Big Day Out and at the SXSW Music Festival in Austin, Texas.

The group's debut EP was released by Flying Nun Records in 1999 featuring the tracks "Girl" and "Come On!". The band was later enhanced by members Vaughan Williams (Vaughn) (bass) and Daniel Pooley (Beaver) (drums). The D4 went on a UK tour supporting The Hives.

As of May 2006, Breakfast announced that after eight years, the D4, would be taking an indefinite break from the music industry. After the split, Rich Mixture went on to replace Paul Robertson as the drummer of The Rock n Roll Machine, bassist Vaughn joined Shocking Pinks, an Auckland-based indie pop act and Jimmy Christmas formed the rock group Luger Boa who have supported Shihad on tour. Most recently, Dion has moved to NYC, formed a new band called The True Lovers and also plays bass in A Place to Bury Strangers.

Discography

Studio albums

Featured appearances
The group have appeared on some compilations and soundtracks since the early 2000s. The following is a list of these albums that have featured tracks by The D4.

Singles

See also
 Garage Rock
 New Zealand music

References

External links
 The D4 At NZ Music
 The D4 official MySpace
 Infectious Records

New Zealand indie rock groups
Post-punk revival music groups
Flying Nun Records artists
Hollywood Records artists
Musical groups established in 1998
Musical groups disestablished in 2006
1998 establishments in New Zealand
2006 disestablishments in New Zealand